Maksim Aleksandrovich Artemchuk (born 9 August 1999) is a Russian football player. He plays for Baltika-BFU Kaliningrad.

Club career
He made his debut in the Russian Professional Football League for FC Dynamo-2 Saint Petersburg on 19 July 2017 in a game against FC Torpedo Vladimir. During the winter-break of 2017–18 he was loaned to Serbian club FK Proleter Novi Sad playing in the Serbian First League, Serbian second tier.

On 28 June 2022, Artemchuk was loaned to Dynamo Brest in Belarus until the end of 2022.

Honours
Proleter Novi Sad
Serbian First League: 2017–18

References

External links
 Profile by Russian Professional Football League
 

1999 births
Footballers from Saint Petersburg
Living people
Russian footballers
Association football forwards
PFC Sochi players
FC Dynamo Saint Petersburg players
FK Proleter Novi Sad players
FK Zlatibor Čajetina players
FC Neftekhimik Nizhnekamsk players
FC Baltika Kaliningrad players
FC Dynamo Brest players
Russian First League players
Russian Second League players
Serbian First League players
Russian expatriate footballers
Expatriate footballers in Serbia
Russian expatriate sportspeople in Serbia
Expatriate footballers in Belarus
Russian expatriate sportspeople in Belarus